Rhombihexahedron may refer to:

Compound of three cubes, a uniform polyhedron compound made by symmetrically arranging 3 cubes
Great rhombihexahedron, a nonconvex uniform polyhedron with 18 faces
Small rhombihexahedron, a nonconvex uniform polyhedron with 18 faces